1972 was a year in the 20th century.

1972 may also refer to:
 1972 (album), a 2003 album by Josh Rouse, and the title song
 1972 (EP), a 2022 EP by The Black Crowes